This is a list of genera in the family Asilidae, robber flies.

Extant genera

 Ablautus Loew, 1866 i c g b
 Abrophila  c g
 Acasilus  c g
 Acnephalomyia Londt, 2010 g
 Acnephalum  c g
 Acrochordomerus  c g
 Acronyches  c g
 Aczelia  c g
 Adelodus  c g
 Afganopogon  c g
 Afroepitriptus  c g
 Afroestricus  c g
 Afroholopogon  c g
 Afromelittodes  c g
 Afromochtherus  c g
 Afromosia
 Afroscleropogon  c g
 Agrostomyia  c g
 Aireina
 Akatiomyia Londt, 2013 g
 Albibarbefferia Artigas & Papavero, 1997 g
 Albicoma  c g
 Alcimus  c g
 Allopogon
 Alvarenga (fly)  c g
 Alyssomyia  c g
 Amathomyia  i c g
 Amblyonychus  i c g
 Ammodaimon  c g
 Ammophilomima  c g
 Amorimius  c g
 Amphisbetetus  c g
 Anacinaces  c g
 Anarmostus  c g
 Anarolius  c g
 Anasillomos  c g
 Ancylorhynchus  c g
 Andrenosoma Rondani, 1856 i c g b
 Aneomochtherus  c g
 Anisopogon  c g
 Annamyia  c g
 Anoplothyrea  c g
 Antilophonotus  c g
 Antipalus Loew, 1849 g
 Antiphrisson  c g
 Antiscylaticus Londt, 2010 g
 Anypodetus  c g
 Apachekolos Martin, 1957 i c g b
 Aphamartania  c g
 Aphestia  c g
 Aphistina  c g
 Aphractia (Homonym)
 Aplestobroma  c g
 Apoclea  c g
 Apolastauroides  c g
 Apothechyla  c g
 Apotinocerus  c g
 Apoxyria  c g
 Araiopogon  c g
 Araucopogon
 Araujoa  c g
 Archilaphria  c g
 Archilestris Loew, 1874 i c g b
 Archilestroides  c g
 Argillemisca  c g
 Argyrochira  c g
 Argyropogon  c g
 Aridefferia Artigas & Papavero, 1997 g
 Aristofolia  c g
 Artigasus 
 Asilella  c g
 Asilus  i c g b
 Asiola  c g
 Aspidopyga  c g
 Astochia  c g
 Astylopogon  c g
 Aterpogon  c g
 Atomosia Macquart, 1838 i c g b
 Atoniomyia Hermann, 1912 i g b
 Atractia  c g
 Atractocoma  c g
 Austenmyia  c g
 Austrosaropogon  c g
 Aymarasilus  c g
 Backomyia Wilcox & Martin, 1957 i c g b
 Bactria  c g
 Bamwardaria  c g
 Bana  c g
 Bathropsis  c g
 Bathypogon  c g
 Beameromyia Martin, 1957 i c g b
 Blepharepium Rondani, 1848 i c g b
 Blepharotes  c g
 Bohartia  i c g
 Borapisma  c g
 Brachyrhopala  c g
 Brevirostrum  c g
 Bromleyus  i c g
 Bromotheres  c g
 Broticosia  c g
 Cabasa  c g
 Caenarolia  c g
 Callinicus Loew, 1872 i c g b
 Carinefferia Artigas & Papavero, 1997 g
 Carreraomyia  c g
 Cenochromyia  c g
 Centrolaphria  c g
 Ceraturgus Rondani, 1856 i c g b
 Cerdistus  c g
 Cerotainia Schiner, 1866 i c g b
 Cerotainiops Curran, 1930 i c g b
 Cerozodus  c g
 Chilesus  c g
 Choerades  c g
 Chryseutria  c g
 Chrysopogon  c g
 Chrysotriclis  c g
 Chylophaga  c g
 Chymedax  c g
 Clariola  c g
 Clephydroneura  c g
 Cleptomyia  c g
 Clinopogon  c g
 Cnodalomyia  c g
 Cochleariocera  c g
 Codula  c g
 Coleomyia Wilcox & Martin, 1935 i c g b
 Colepia  c g
 Comantella Curran, 1923 i c g b
 Coneccaplypsis  g
 Congomochtherus  c g
 Connomyia  c g
 Conosiphon  c g
 Cophinopoda  c g
 Cophura Osten-Sacken, 1887 i c g b
 Cormansis  c g
 Corymyia  c g
 Craspedia Macquart, 1839 g
 Cratolestes  c g
 Cratopoda  c g
 Creolestes  c g
 Crobilocerus  c g
 Cryptomerinx  c g
 Ctenodontina  c g
 Ctenota  c g
 Cyanonedys  c g
 Cyclosocerus  c g
 Cylicomera  c g
 Cyphomyiactia  c g
 Cyphotomyia  c g
 Cyrtophrys  c g
 Cyrtopogon Loew, 1847 i c g b
 Dakinomyia  c g
 Damalina  c g
 Damalis  c g
 Danomyia  c g
 Daptolestes  c g
 Dasophrys  c g
 Daspletis  c g
 Dasycyrton  c g
 Dasylechia Williston, 1907 i c g b
 Dasyllina  c g
 Dasyllis  c g
 Dasypecus  c g
 Dasypogon  c g
 Deromyia  c g
 Despotiscus  c g
 Dichaetothyrea  c g
 Dicolonus Loew, 1866 i c g b
 Dicranus  i c g
 Dicropaltum Martin, 1975 i c g b
 Dikowmyia  c g
 Dinozabrus  c g
 Dioctobroma  c g
 Dioctria Meigen, 1803 i c g b
 Diogmites Loew, 1866 i c g b  (hanging-thieves)
 Diplosynapsis Enderlein, 1914 g
 Dissmeryngodes  c g
 Dogonia  c g
 Dolopus  c g
 Dysclytus  c g
 Dysmachus  c g
 Eccoptopus  c g
 Eccritosia Schiner, 1866 i c g b
 Echthistus  c g
 Echthodopa Loew, 1866 i c g b
 Eclipsis  c g
 Efferia Coquillett, 1893 i c g b
 Eicherax  c g
 Eichoichemus  c g
 Emphysomera Schiner, 1866 g
 Empodiodes  c g
 Engelepogon  c g
 Enigmomorphus  c g
 Epaphroditus  c g
 Epiblepharis  c g
 Epiklisis  c g
 Epipamponeurus  c g
 Epitriptus  c g
 Erax  c g
 Eraxasilus  c g
 Erebunus  c g
 Eremisca  c g
 Eremodromus  c g
 Eremomyia Artigas, 1970 g
 Eremonotus  c g
 Eretomyia  c g
 Ericomyia
 Eriopogon  c g
 Erythropogon  c g
 Esatanas  c g
 Eucyrtopogon Curran, 1923 i c g b
 Eudioctria Wilcox & Martin, 1941 i c g b
 Eumecosoma  c g
 Eurhabdus  c g
 Euscelidia  c g
 Eutolmus  c g
 Filiolus  c g
 Fishermyia Londt, 2012 g
 Furcilla  i
 Galactopogon  c g
 Gerrolasius  c g
 Gibbasilus  c g
 Glaphyropyga  c g
 Glyphotriclis  c g
 Goneccalypsis  c g
 Gongromyia  c g
 Gonioscelis  c g
 Grajahua  c g
 Graptostylus  c g
 Grypoctonus  c g
 Gymnotriclis  c g
 Habropogon  c g
 Hadrokolos Martin, 1959 i c g b
 Haplopogon Engel, 1930 i c g b
 Haroldia  c g
 Harpagobroma  c g
 Heligmoneura  g
 Heligmonevra  c g
 Helolaphyctis  c g
 Hermannomyia  c g
 Heteropogon Loew, 1847 i c g b
 Hexameritia  c g
 Hippomachus Engel, 1927 g
 Hodites  c g
 Hodophylax James, 1933 i c g b
 Holcocephala Jaennicke, 1867 i c g b
 Holopheromerus  g
 Holopogon Kom. & Nevski, 1935 i c g b
 Hoplistomerus  c g
 Hoplopheromerus  c g
 Hoplotriclis  c g
 Hullia  c g
 Hybozelodes  c g
 Hynirhynchus  c g
 Hypenetes  c g
 Hyperechia  c g
 Hystrichopogon  c g
 Icariomima  c g
 Ichneumolaphria  c g
 Illudium  c g
 Iranopogon  c g
 Irwinomyia  c g
 Ischiolobos  c g
 Itolia Wilcox, 1936 i c g b
 Ivettea
 Joartigasia  c g
 Jothopogon  c g
 Juxtasilus  c
 Katharma  c g
 Katharmacercus
 Ktyr  c g
 Ktyrimisca  c g
 Kurzenkoiellus
 Labarus  c g
 Labromyia  c g
 Lagodias  c g
 Lagynogaster  c g
 Laloides  c g
 Lampria Macquart, 1838 i c g b
 Lamprozona  c g
 Lamyra  c g
 Laphria Meigen, 1803 i c g b  (bee-like robber flies)
 Laphygmolestes  c g
 Laphystia Loew, 1847 i c g b
 Laphystotes  c g
 Lapystia  c g
 Lasiocnemus  c g
 Lasiopogon Loew, 1847 i c g b
 Lastaurax  c g
 Lastaurina  c g
 Lastauroides  c g
 Lastauropsis  c g
 Lastaurus  c g
 Laxenecera  c g
 Lecania  c g
 Leinendera  c g
 Leptarthrus  c g
 Leptochelina  c g
 Leptogaster Meigen, 1803 i c g b
 Leptoharpacticus  c g
 Leptopteromyia Williston, 1907 i c g b
 Lestomyia Williston, 1883 i c g b
 Lestophonax  c g
 Lissoteles  c g
 Lithoecisus  c g
 Lobus  c g
 Lochmorhynchus  c g
 Lochyrus  c g
 Loewinella  c g
 Lonchodogonus  c g
 Longivena Vieira & Rafael, 2014 g
 Lophonotus Macquart, 1838 g
 Lophopeltis Engel, 1925 g
 Lycomya  c g
 Lycoprosopa  c g
 Lycosimyia  c g
 Lycostommyia  c g
 Macahyba  c g
 Machimus Loew, 1849 i c g b
 Macroetra  c g
 Mactea  c g
 Maira  c g
 Mallophora Macquart, 1838 i c g b  (bee killers)
 Martinomyia  c g
 Martintella  c g
 Mauropteron  c g
 Megadrillus  c g
 Megalometopon  c g
 Megaphorus Bigot, 1857 i c g b
 Megapoda  c g
 Megonyx  c g
 Meliponomima  c g
 Melouromyia  c g
 Mercuriana  c g
 Merodontina  c g
 Mesoleptogaster  c g
 Metadioctria Wilcox & Martin, 1941 i c g b
 Metalaphria  c g
 Metapogon Coquillett, 1904 i c g b
 Michotamia  c g
 Microphontes  c g
 Microstylum Macquart, 1838 i c g b
 Millenarius  c g
 Minicatus  c g
 Mirolestes  c g
 Molobratia  c g
 Myaptex  c g
 Myelaphus Bigot, 1882 i c g b
 Nannocyrtopogon Wilcox & Martin, 1936 i c g b
 Nannolaphria  c g
 Negasilus Curran, 1934 i c g b
 Neoaratus  c g
 Neocerdistus  c g
 Neocyrtopogon  c g
 Neoderomyia  c g
 Neodioctria  c g
 Neodiogmites  c g
 Neodysmachus  c g
 Neoepitriptus Lehr, 1992 g
 Neoholopogon  c g
 Neoitamus Osten Sacken, 1878 i c g b
 Neolaparus  c g
 Neolophonotus  c g
 Neomochtherus Osten Sacken, 1878 i c g b
 Neophoneus  c g
 Neosaropogon  c g
 Neoscleropogon  c g
 Nerax Hull, 1962 g
 Nerterhaptomenus  c g
 Nesotes  c g
 Nevadasilus  b
 Nicocles Jaennicke, 1867 i c g b
 Nomomyia  c g
 Nothopogon  c g
 Notiolaphria  c g
 Notomochtherus  c g
 Nusa  c g
 Nyssomyia  c g
 Nyssoprosopa  c g
 Nyximyia  c g
 Obelophorus  c g
 Odus  c g
 Oidardis  c g
 Oligopogon  c g
 Oligoschema  c g
 Ommatius Wiedemann, 1821 i c g b
 Omninablautus Pritchard, 1935 i c g b
 Ontomyia Dikow & Londt, 2000 g
 Opeatocerus  c g
 Ophionomima  c g
 Opocapsis  c g
 Opseostlengis  c g
 Oratostylum  c g
 Orophotus  c g
 Orrhodops  i c g
 Orthogonis Herman, 1914 i c g b
 Ospriocerus Loew, 1866 i g b
 Othoniomyia  c g
 Oxynoton  c g
 Pachychoeta  c g
 Palamopogon Bezzi, 1927 g
 Pamponerus  c g
 Papaverellus Artigas & Vieira, 2014 g
 Paramochtherus  c g
 Paraphamartania  c g
 Parastenopogon  c g
 Parataracticus Cole, 1924 i c g b
 Paraterpogon  c g
 Paratractia  c g
 Paritamus  c g
 Pashtshenkoa  c g
 Pedomyia  c g
 Pegesimallus  c g
 Perasis  i c g
 Phellopteron  c g
 Phellus  c g
 Phileris  c g
 Philodicus  c g
 Philonerax  c g
 Philonicus Loew, 1849 i c g b
 Phonicocleptes  c g
 Plesiomma Macquart, 1838 i c g b
 Pogonioefferia Artigas & Papavero, 1997 g
 Pogonosoma Rondani, 1856 i c g b
 Polacantha Martin, 1975 i c g b
 Polyphonius  c g
 Polysarca  c g
 Polysarcodes  c g
 Porasilus Curran, 1934 g
 Premochtherus  c g
 Pritchardia  c g
 Pritchardomyia Wilcox, 1965 i c g b
 Proagonistes  c g
 Proctacanthella Bromley, 1934 i c g b
 Proctacanthus Macquart, 1838 i c g b
 Prolatiforceps  i c g
 Prolepsis Walker, 1851 i c g b
 Promachella Cole & Pritchard, 1964 i c g b
 Promachus Loew, 1848 i c g b  (giant robber flies)
 Pronomopsis  c g
 Protichisma  c g
 Protometer  c g
 Prytanomyia  c g
 Pseudomerodontina  c g
 Pseudonusa  c g
 Pseudophrisson Durrenfeldt, 1968 g
 Pseudorus  c g
 Pseudoryclus  c g
 Psilinus  c g
 Psilocurus Loew, 1874 i c g b
 Psilonyx Aldrich, 1923 i c g b
 Psilozona  c g
 Pycnomerinx  c g
 Pycnopogon  c g
 Pygommatius  c g
 Questopogon  c g
 Rachiopogon  c g
 Reburrus  c g
 Regasilus  i c g
 Remotomyia  c g
 Rhabdogaster  c g
 Rhacholaemus  c g
 Rhadinosoma  c g
 Rhadinus  c g
 Rhadiurgus  i c g
 Rhatimomyia  c g
 Rhayatus  c g
 Rhipidocephala  c g
 Rhopalogaster  c g
 Robertomyia  c g
 Saropogon Loew, 1847 i c g b
 Satanas  c g
 Scarbroughia  c g
 Schildia  c g
 Scleropogon Loew, 1866 i c g b
 Scylaticina  c g
 Scylaticus  c g
 Scytomedes  c g
 Senobasis  c g
 Senoprosopis  c g
 Sinopsilonyx  c g
 Sintoria Hull, 1962 i c g b
 Sisyrnodytes  c g
 Smeryngolaphria  c g
 Spanurus  c g
 Sphageus Loew, 1866 g
 Sphagomyia  c g
 Sporadothrix  c g
 Stackelberginia  c g
 Stenasilus  c g
 Stenommatius  c g
 Stenopogon Loew, 1847 i c g b
 Stichopogon Loew, 1847 i c g b
 Stilpnogaster  c g
 Stiphrolamyra  c g
 Stizochymus  c g
 Stizolestes  c g
 Storthyngomerus  c g
 Strombocodia  c g
 Strophipogon  c g
 Synolcus  c g
 Systologaster  c g
 Systropalpus  c g
 Tanatchivia  c g
 Taperigna  c g
 Taracticus Loew, 1872 i c g b
 Templasilus  c g
 Teratopomyia  c g
 Thallosia  c g
 Theodoria  c g
 Thereutria  c g
 Theromyia  c g
 Theurgus  c g
 Threnia  c g
 Tipulogaster Cockerell, 1913 i c g b
 Tocantinia  c g
 Tolmerolestes  c g
 Tolmerus Loew, 1849 c g b
 Torasilus  c g
 Torebroma  c g
 Toremyia  c g
 Townsendia Williston, 1895 i c g b
 Tricella  c g
 Trichardis  c g
 Trichardopsis  c g
 Trichomachimus  c g
 Trichoura  c g
 Triclioscelis  c g
 Triclis  c g
 Trigonomima  c g
 Triorla Parks, 1968 i c g b
 Tsacasia  c g
 Tsacasiella  c g
 Turka  c g
 Udenopogon  c g
 Ujguricola  c g
 Valiraptor  c g
 Wilcoxia James, 1941 i c g b
 Wilcoxius  c g
 Willistonina  i c g
 Wyliea  i b
 Yksdarhus  c g
 Zabrops Hull, 1958 i c g b
 Zabrotica  c g
 Zelamyia  c g
 Zosteria  c g
 Zoticus  c g

Fossil genera
 †Araripogon Grimaldi, 1990 g
 ↑Asilopsis Cockerell, 1920 g
 †Burmapogon Dikow and Grimaldi, 2014
 †Cretagaster Dikow & Grimaldi, 2014 g
 †Protoloewinella Schumann, 1984
 †Stenocinclis Scudder, 1878 g
Data sources: i = ITIS, c = Catalogue of Life, g = GBIF, b = Bugguide.net

References